Just for You is the seventh studio album by American singer Lionel Richie. It was released by Island Records first on March 8, 2004, in the United Kingdom. Released shortly after Richie's divorce from his second wife Diane, the album features Richie in collaboration with singers and musicians from different backgrounds, including frequent collaborators Chuckii Booker, Mark Taylor, and Ric Wake as well as contemporary R&B producer 7 Aurelius and singers Daniel Bedingfield and Lenny Kravitz, both of whom appear as guest vocalists.

Just for You received mixed reviews, with much of the criticism targeted at the album's lyrics. It entered the top five in Austria and the United Kingdom, and reached the top ten of the German and Swiss Albums Chart. In the UK, the album sold more than 100,000 copies and was certified gold by the British Phonographic Industry (BPI). In the US, it debuted at number 47 on the Billboard 200 and number 22 on the Top R&B/Hip-Hop Albums chart, eventually selling 207,000 copies. The album spawned several singles, with lead single "Just for You" reaching the top thirty on several charts.

Background
Richie, previously a member of the Commodores, had become a solo artist in the early 1980s. With the release of Can't Slow Down in 1983, he became one of the biggest solo acts in the country before leaving the industry in 1987. He began working towards a comeback in the late 1990s but while he enjoyed international success, his albums failed to chart or sell noticeably in the United States. Following the release of his hit compilation album The Definitive Collection in 2003 and his daughter Nicole's appearance in The Simple Life, Richie returned to public attention. Shortly before producing Just for You Richie and his wife, Diane, were divorced.

For his seventh album Richie brought singers and musicians from different genres. Lenny Kravitz and Daniel Bedingfield sang duets with him, while songwriters Paul Barry and Mark Taylor – who were best known for light works – wrote several songs. Another guest songwriter and producer was 7 Aurelius, of Murder, Inc. In a 2004 interview with NBC, Richie stated that he had been approached to record Just for You by his manager in London. He found it easy to write, because "all I had to do was play myself." In another interview, Richie said that – as opposed to "Three Times a Lady", which he had dedicated to his ex-wife Brenda – Just for You was dedicated to himself, an "introverted perspective" on what had excited him.

Critical reception

Just for You received mixed reviews, with Album of the Year collecting 4 reviews and calculating an average of 51 out of 100. Dominic Darrah of Soul Shine Magazine gave the album four out of five stars, praising its mix of "sweet ballads" and "new sounds". The Guardian Dave Simpson found that Richie was "disturbingly in tune with the times," mixing "boy band anthems" with funk, rock, and soul. Stephen Thomas Erlewine, writing for AllMusic, gave Just for You three out of five stars, considering the album "well-crafted" and consistent in sound quality and cohesive. He found, however, that the album was weaker than Richie's work in the 1980s.  Marcus Reeves of Vibe likewise gave the album three stars, finding that several tracks – such as "She's Amazing" – to be reflective of Richie's earlier work, although he dismissed the "cheesy, clichéd lyrics" of the "we-are-the-world social anthems" included. He concluded that, although the album was well made, it would please only Richie's existing fans.

Jack Smith of BBC Music found Just for You "far better than many would ofdreamed  possible", highlighting the album's two duets as among its best and describing "Just to Be with You Again" as "sensitively produced and performed to absolute perfection". Clare Colley of musicOMH described the album as a "back to basics record", with "Do Ya" and "If You Belong to Me" as its best tracks. Ultimately she was disappointed with the release; she criticized the lyrics as generally "mawkish", with the album overall "chronically underdeveloped and bland". Christian Hoard and Jon Caramanica of Rolling Stone gave the album two stars out of five, writing that Richie had not "stray[ed] too far from his strengths" in producing the work. Kristina Feliciano of Entertainment Weekly was highly critical of the album, writing that its lyrics were "flaccid", with the sound unproportional. Katie Moten of RTÉ.ie found the album "disappointing", lacking originality; she considered "Do Ya" the only good song.

Chart performance
Just for You was released on March 8, 2004, in the United Kingdom and May 4, of that same year in the United States. In the US, the album debuted at number 47 on the Billboard 200 and number 22 on the publication's Top R&B/Hip-Hop Albums chart, becoming Richie's highest-charting album since Louder Than Words (1996). Elsewhere, Just for You entered the top five in Austria and the United Kingdom, and reached the top ten in Germany and Switzerland. In the UK, it surpassed the mark of 100,000 sold copies within its first two weeks of release and was certfiied gold by the British Phonographic Industry (BPI).

Three singles from the album, "Just for You", "Just for You (The Dance Remixes)", and "Long, Long Way to Go", charted. "Just for You" performed best of these, peaking at number 6 on the Adult Contemporary chart. , the album has sold 207,000 copies in the United States, according to Nielsen SoundScan. Richie's subsequent releases have shown a consistent increase in sales, beginning with 2006's Coming Home.

Track listing

Notes
 signifies an additional producer
 signifies a co-producer
 signifies an original producer

Charts

Weekly charts

Year-end charts

Certifications and sales

References

Works cited

2004 albums
Lionel Richie albums
Albums produced by Tim & Bob
Island Records albums